Elliot Grove is a Canadian-born film producer who founded both the Raindance Film Festival in 1993 and the British Independent Film Awards in 1998.

Biography 
Despite being unable to watch TV or films until his early teens due to the constraints of his Mennonite background, Grove was curious about art and film. He, thus, followed up formal art school training at Central Technical School in Toronto with a series of jobs behind the scenes in the film industry.

Working as a scenic artist on 68 feature films and over 700 commercials in his native Toronto, he developed a distaste for the wasted resources on set and union bureaucracy that prevented aspiring filmmakers like himself from getting their own features off the ground.

Raindance 

Elliot moved to London in the late 1980s and in 1993 he launched the Raindance Film Festival, a festival devoted to independent filmmaking and its emerging talent. In 2009 he was awarded a doctorate from the Open University at Plymouth College of Art.

Initially, Raindance catered mainly to American independent filmmakers, but over the years the participants have become more global. The 2020 festival line-up included nearly one hundred independent features and 150 shorts, web series, music videos and VR experiences selected from submissions from 119 countries.

Course Instruction 
Elliot lectures on screenwriting and filmmaking throughout the UK, Europe, North America and Japan. In 1992 he set up the training division of Raindance which now offers short masterclasses on writing, directing, producing and marketing films on a budget.

Publications 
In 2001 Focal Press published his book: Raindance Writers Lab: How to Write and Sell the Hot Script. His second book, Raindance Producer’s Lab Lo-To-No Budget Filmmaking was published by Focal Press in July 2004. 150 Workouts To Becoming A Filmmaker was published by Barrons (USA 2009) and has since been translated into French, German, Spanish and Italian.

Production 
Upholding the ethos of Raindance, Elliot wrote, produced and directed 1997's feature, Table 5, for just over £200.

His production company operates under the Raindance banner and is currently developing a slate of ten features. In 2005 he produced The Living and the Dead an arty British chiller, the world premiere which was at the Rotterdam Film Festival in January 2006. Elliot stopped producing features between 2007 and 2012 because of his involvement with Raindance. In early 2013 he re-launched production with the stylish thriller Deadly Virtues: Love.Honour.Obey. which started principal photography in May 2013. It was written by Mark Rogers and is directed by cult film director Ate de Jong (Drop Dead Fred).

References

External links

 
 Elliot Grove's Twitter

Year of birth missing (living people)
Living people
British male screenwriters
British film directors
British film producers
British self-help writers
Canadian emigrants to England
Screenwriting instructors